Ghoshnagor is a village and Union in Patnitala Upazila, Naogaon District, Rajshahi Division, Bangladesh.

Demographics
It covers an area of about 15 square kilometers and has a population of about ten thousand (2016). Educational institutions include Ghoshnagor High School and Ghoshnagor Zongipir Shaheb Alim Madrasha. Other buildings include one rice mill, one community clinic, and twelve mosques.

Administration
The Administrative Council of the Union consists of three women Members of the reserved women's seat and nine General Members under one chairman.

Economy
Most of the people of Ghoshnagor union depends on the agriculture to earn their livelihood. The main crops are paddy, wheat, mustard seed, mango etc.

See also
Gaganpur

References

Unions of Patnitala Upazila